Akaki Tskarozia (Georgian: აკაკი წყაროზია, born 2 August 1988) is a Georgia football midfielder who last played for FC Telavi in the Erovnuli Liga 2.

Club
He began his career with Russian clubs FC Znamya Truda Orekhovo-Zuyevo and FC Mashuk. After a spell back home with FC Lokomotivi Tbilisi in 2007, he moved again abroad, this time to Serbia to play first with lower league side FK Sinđelić Beograd and next with Serbian First League club FK Bežanija. In 2009, he returned to Georgia to play with FC Samtredia in the Georgian Top League. During the winter break of the 2009–10 season he moved to Prykarpattya Ivano-Frankivsk and played with them in the Ukrainian First League. In the following winter break he joined Slovak club FK Bodva Moldava nad Bodvou playing in the Slovak 2. liga. In summer 2013 he returned to Georgia and joined top flight side FC WIT Georgia.

References

External links 
 
 
 

Living people
1988 births
Footballers from Tbilisi
Footballers from Georgia (country)
Expatriate footballers from Georgia (country)
Expatriate footballers in Russia
FC Lokomotivi Tbilisi players
FK Sinđelić Beograd players
FK Bežanija players
Expatriate footballers in Serbia
Association football midfielders
FK Bodva Moldava nad Bodvou players
Expatriate footballers in Slovakia
FC WIT Georgia players
FC Merani Martvili players
FC Zugdidi players
FC Prykarpattia Ivano-Frankivsk (2004) players
FC Znamya Truda Orekhovo-Zuyevo players
FC Mashuk-KMV Pyatigorsk players